Morelle may refer to:

Charles Morelle Bruce (1853–1938), American businessman and politician
Anne Lévy-Morelle (born 1961), Belgian film director and writer
Denise Morelle (1926–1984), Quebec actress murdered in 1984
Joseph Morelle (born 1957), American politician
Rebecca Morelle, British science journalist, global science correspondent for BBC News
Morelle Smith, Scottish author of poetry, essays, fiction, and travel articles

See also
Doctor Morelle, 1949 British mystery film directed by Godfrey Grayson
Greens Morelle (disambiguation)
Merille
Mireille
Morille